"Vivre ou survivre" is a famous French language song written, composed and sung by the French singer Daniel Balavoine. It appears on his 1982 album Vendeurs de larmes. It was the start of a big career for Balavoine and an example of new wave revival of rock music in France.

Track listings
Album version
"Vivre ou survivre" - 3:34

Credits and personnel
Lead vocals – Daniel Balavoine
Producers – Léo Missir
Music – Daniel Balavoine
Lyrics –  Daniel Balavoine
Label: Barclay Records

Other versions
Natasha St-Pier sang it with the 500 Choristes. It also appears, as "Vivre ou survivre (Version chorale)", on her album Tu trouveras... 10 ans de succès

Christophe Maé has performed the song live. Sébastien Agius, the winner of the first series of X Factor in France, sang the song during the show.

Matthew Raymond-Barker version

"Vivre ou survivre" is the first single by the English singer Matthew Raymond-Barker, winner of the second series of X Factor in France, where it was released as a download on 2 July 2011. He performed the song live in the final.

Track listing
Digital download
 "Vivre ou survivre" - 2:59

Charts

Release history

References

1982 singles
2011 singles
Daniel Balavoine songs
Songs written by Daniel Balavoine
1982 songs
Barclay (record label) singles